Panaghoy sa Suba, is a 2004 Visayan language film produced and directed by Cesar Montano, who also played the lead role. Panaghoy sa Suba is an historical romance drama about a love triangle which takes place during the Second World War. Its themes concern Filipino nationalism and the legacies of colonialism.

Plot 

The story is set in Bohol, Central Visayas during World War II   before, during, and immediately after, the Japanese Occupation of the Philippines.

Duroy (Cesar Montano) is a banca operator who falls in love with Iset (Juliana Palermo), the most bewitching girl in her village.  Iset is an obedient child whose father and materialistic aunt hope that she will marry the American businessman who employs her and thereby achieve wealth and status. The resident American businessman, John Smith (played by Philip Anthony), is an abusive, rude and stingy landowner. He notices Iset's beauty but sees her as a potential mistress rather than a future wife. Islet loves Duroy but obeys her parents.

Ibô (Reiven Bulado), Duroy's brother, is also smitten with Iset. As Duroy adores his family and does not want to get in his brother's way, he stops courting Iset. Duroy is devoted to his family, his mother (Daria Ramirez), Ibô and his sister, Bikay (multi-awarded former child star Rebecca Lusterio). Heartbroken after her husband leaves for an American woman and ill, Duroy's mother dies when they run out of money to purchase her medicine. John Smith sees Ibo talking with Iset at the warehouse and shoots him on the spot. Duroy vows revenge.

When the Japanese invasion begins, many men of the village flee into the mountains to become guerillas. The women and children stay, along with an American priest. John Smith is drafted into the American army and leaves. The Japanese commander who arrives notices Iset but does not attack her as many Japanese military personnel did elsewhere in the Philippines during the war. With the Japanese now in power Iset's aunt wants her to marry the officer.

Several years pass before Duroy and his men launch an attack against the Japanese garrison. The Japanese responded by killing the priest and taking hostages. In 1945, a group of Filipino and American troops arrive to help the Boholano guerrilla force defeat the Japanese troops. Duroy kills the Japanese commander after a long man-against-man battle.

John Smith (mockingly dubbed "White Balls" by Duroy and his friends) returns after the war expecting life to continue as it was before the Japanese invasion. Duroy attacks him but after beating Smith and thoroughly humiliating him tells Smith that he isn't worth killing him. Iset refuses John Smith's clumsy offer to renew their relationship and chooses Duroy.

Cast 
 Cesar Montano as Duroy
 Juliana Palermo as Iset
 Reiven Bulado as Ibô (Duroy's brother)
 Daria Ramirez as Duroy's mother
 Rebecca Lusterio aa Bikay (Duroy's sister)
 Jackie Woo as Fumio Okohara (Japanese Army officer)
 Phil Anthony as John Smith
 Caridad Sanchez – Aunt Lahi
 Joel Torre as Damian
 Ronnie Lazaro 
 Suzette Ranillo 
 Rommel Montano 
 Dr. Warfe Engracia 
 Ramon Villanueva 
 Chelo Espina 
 Disi Alba
 Yvesse Carlo Suan

Filming 
Panaghoy sa Suba was actor Cesar Montano's directorial debut. The filming was done in Bohol, the Philippines with a mostly Visayan cast. One of the producers, R.D. Alba had attended the Los Angeles Film School.

Screening and reception 
Panaghoy sa Suba was given an "A" rating by the Cinema Evaluation Board (C.E.B.) of the Film Development Council of the Philippines. The CEB described Cesar Montano's direction as "meticulous but light-handed."  It turned "a somewhat rambling and slow screenplay into a poetic, sometimes even magical, current of silent struggle and survival."
UNESCO also endorsed the film.

Panaghoy sa Suba was included as an exhibition in the Tous les Cinemas du Monde at the Cannes Film Festival in 2005. It has also been screened at film festivals in Berlin, Toronto, Tokyo, Korea and in the Czech Republic at the "Karlo Vary Film Festival". In 2005, it was also shown at the Shanghai International Film Festival and the Festival of Asian Cinema in New Delhi.

Awards 
Panaghoy sa Suba won 16 awards and 11 nominations. It was entered in the 2004 Metro Manila Film Festival where it won the Gatpuno Villegas Cultural Award and others including Second Best Picture (to Mano Po III: My Love), Best Director, Best Supporting Actress, Best Screenplay, Best Cinematography and Best Musical Score.  In 2005, at the Gawad Suri Awards in Manila, it won Best Actor and Best Supporting Actress awards.

The film was named Best Picture at the "International Festival of Independent Films" held in Brussels, Belgium. There, Montano was also chosen as Best Director.

At the Golden Screen Awards, Montano won Best Actor for his performance.

The awards for the film include:
 2004 
 Best Screenplay – Cris Vertido 
 Best Cinematography – Ely Cruz 
 Best Musical Score – Nonong Buencamino 
 Best Supporting Actress – Rebecca Lusterio
 Gatpuno Antonio J. Villegas Cultural Award – CM Films 
 Best Director – Cesar Montano
 Second Best Picture
 Film Academy of the Philippine Awards 2005
 Best Cinematography – Ely Cruz 
 Best Musical Scoring – Nonog Buencamino 
 Best Screenplay – Cris Vertido 
 Best Director – Cesar Montano (nominated)
 Best Picture (nominated)
 Best Sound (nominated)
 Best Supporting Actor – Ronnie Lazaro (nominated)
 Best Supporting Actress – Daria Ramirez (nominated)
Gawad Urian Awards, 2005
 Best Actor – Cesar Montano 
 Best Cinematography – Ely Cruz 
 Best Direction – Cesar Montano 
 Best Music – Nonog Buencamino 
 Best Picture 
 Best Sound
 Best Editing – Renato de Leon (nominated)
 Best Production Design (Pinakamahusay na Disenyong Pamproduksiyon) – Allan Leyres and Ron Heri Tan (nominated)
 Best Screenplay (Pinakamahusay na Dulang Pampelikula) – Cris Vertido (nominated)
 Best Supporting Actor (Pinakamahusay na Pangalawang Aktor) – Jacky Woo (nominated)
 Best Supporting Actress (Pinakamahusay na Pangalawang Aktres) – Rebecca Lusterio (nominated)
 Best Supporting Actress (Pinakamahusay na Pangalawang Aktres) – Juliana Palermo(nominated)

References

External links 

 
 A River Worth More than a Thousand Films

2004 films
Culture of Bohol
2000s Japanese-language films
Japanese occupation of the Philippines films
Philippine drama films
2000s Tagalog-language films
Visayan culture
Visayan-language films
World War II films
2004 directorial debut films
2000s English-language films
Films directed by Cesar Montano